Lípa is a municipality and village in Zlín District in the Zlín Region of the Czech Republic. It has about 800 inhabitants.

Gallery

References

Villages in Zlín District